Iodotropheus stuartgranti is a species of cichlid endemic to Lake Malawi.  It can also be found in the aquarium trade.  This species can reach a length of  TL. The specific name honours Stuart M. Grant (1937-2007), an exporter of cichlids from lake Malawi for the aquarium trade. This species feeds maonly on aufwuchs. The males are territorial and the female will lay anywhere within a male's territory.

References

stuartgranti
Taxa named by Ad Konings
Taxonomy articles created by Polbot
Fish described in 1990